1988 in Korea may refer to:
1988 in North Korea
1988 in South Korea